Hypochalcia balcanica is a species of snout moth in the genus Hypochalcia. It was described by Ragonot in 1887. It is found in Romania and Bulgaria.

The wingspan is 30 mm for males and 24 mm for females.

References

Moths described in 1887
Phycitini
Moths of Europe